The Presidential Council for the Development of Civil Society and Human Rights is a consultative body to the President of the Russian Federation, tasked with assisting him in guaranteeing and protecting human rights and freedoms in Russia. Since October 21, 2019, the chairman of the Council has been Valery Fadeyev.

The Council was created in 2004 by reorganizing the Commission on human rights, which existed since November 1993.

The Council currently consists of 47 people, including political scientist Sergey Karaganov, filmmaker Alexander Sokurov, journalist Kirill Vyshinsky and economist Yevgeny Yasin.

Chairmen 
 Ella Pamfilova (1 November 2004 – 30 July 2010)
 Mikhail Fedotov (12 October 2010 – 22 October 2019)
 Valery Fadeyev (from 22 October 2019)

Criticism 
On October 5, 2009, the Council issued a statement condemning the actions of the Nashi activists against journalist Alexander Podrabinek. The original version of the statement, posted on the Council's website, did not condemn Podrabinek's frank statements towards WWII veterans. However, the statement was later edited (according to some sources, after a call from a high-ranking official to Ella Pamfilova) and included remarks that the Council did not agree with Podrabinek's position. Valery Fadeyev, future chairman of the council, described its behavior within Podrabinek controversy as strange and unnatural.

Journalist Maksim Shevchenko, who was a member of the Council in 2012–18, described its activities as follows:

References

External links 
 

Government of Russia
2004 establishments in Russia